Ammonite is a 2020 romantic drama film written and directed by Francis Lee. The film is loosely inspired by the life of British palaeontologist Mary Anning, played by Kate Winslet. The film centres on a speculative romantic relationship between Anning and Charlotte Murchison, played by Saoirse Ronan. Gemma Jones, James McArdle, Alec Secăreanu and Fiona Shaw also star.

The film had its world premiere at the Toronto International Film Festival on 11 September 2020. It was released in Australia on 14 January 2021 by Transmission Films and in the United Kingdom on 26 March 2021 by Lionsgate.

Plot
In the 1840s, fossil collector and paleontologist Mary Anning lives with her ailing mother Molly, who helps Mary run a small shop in Lyme Regis, Dorset. Mary spends the early mornings on the beach at low tide in search of fossils for the shop, with tiny ammonites being her most common find. When she returns, she helps her mother wash and polish a collection of eight animal figurines.

One day, geologist Roderick Murchison visits Mary's shop accompanied by his wife, Charlotte. He expresses his admiration for Mary's work and offers to pay her for a guided trip to the shore where he can learn from Mary about fossil collecting. While initially antagonistic, Mary accepts his offer. That night in their room at the Three Cups Hotel, Roderick treats Charlotte coldly, rebuffing her sexual advances and saying that now is not the time to have another baby.

Roderick returns from his morning trip with Mary to the shoreline and finds Charlotte confined to her bed in a depressed state. He returns to Mary's shop and reveals that Charlotte has been sent to Lyme Regis in order to convalesce, and entrusts her to Mary's care as he will be departing to Europe for four to six weeks. Mary reluctantly agrees, not wanting to pass up the money. Charlotte begins going out with Mary on her morning beach trips.

After bathing in the ocean as part of her rehabilitation, Charlotte falls ill with a high fever. Her physician, Dr. Lieberson, prescribes bed rest and assigns Mary to be her bedside nurse. Mary visits her friend Elizabeth Philpot, from whom she purchases a jar of salve to aid Charlotte's recovery. Mary refuses Elizabeth's friendly offer to come in for a visit. Charlotte quickly recovers, and from then on accompanies Mary on more outings and tries to help with domestic chores. Together with Mary, she is able to construct a mirror frame made of cowries. Saddened by her own failed attempts to have a baby, Charlotte learns that the figurines which Molly cleans every day represent her eight deceased children.

Dr. Lieberson visits the shop and invites Mary to an evening recital. Mary accepts but insists on bringing Charlotte as well, whom she believes has made a full recovery. That night, Charlotte meets and mingles with the townsfolk as an overwhelmed and jealous Mary smokes outside in the rain while watching through the window. They watch a magic lantern show set to a cello performance before Mary leaves and returns home during the rainstorm. Charlotte arrives soon after and finds Mary writing a romantic poem in her journal.

Using the boards from a beached boat, Mary and Charlotte transfer a large rock to the shop. Inside, they find the fossil of an Ichthyosaur similar to one which Mary found when she was aged 11 and sent to The British Museum. As they clean Mary's tools in preparation before going to bed, Charlotte kisses Mary goodnight; this inflames their attraction to one another, and they engage in oral sex. Their relationship blossoms, as they gleefully swim in the ocean and share their meals. A letter soon arrives from Roderick, instructing Charlotte to return home to London. Distraught, Charlotte and Mary have passionate sex the night before Charlotte's departure. Sometime later, Molly suffers a fall at home and dies soon afterwards. Elizabeth visits the depressed Mary to express her condolences. She encourages Mary to not abandon her relationship with Charlotte, as Mary did with their own romantic relationship after the death of Mary's father.

Mary receives a letter from Charlotte asking her to make the journey to London. Upon arriving at the Murchison house, Mary sees one of her large ammonite fossils on display in a glass cabinet. Charlotte takes Mary upstairs, where she shows Mary a fully furnished bedroom ready for her to move into. Perturbed, Mary leaves after accusing Charlotte of not respecting her life, stating she will not become an ornament for Charlotte to display in a "gilded cage."

At the British Museum, Mary makes her way through the halls of paintings and sculptures. She finds the exhibit case containing her original Ichthyosaurus but sees that it makes no mention of her. Charlotte arrives, and the two women gaze at each other through the glass.

Cast

Kate Winslet as Mary Anning
Saoirse Ronan as Charlotte Murchison
Fiona Shaw as Elizabeth Philpot
Gemma Jones as Molly Anning
James McArdle as Roderick Murchison
Alec Secăreanu as Dr. Lieberson
Claire Rushbrook as Eleanor Butters

Production
In December 2018, it was announced Kate Winslet and Saoirse Ronan had joined the cast of the film, with Francis Lee directing the screenplay he wrote. Iain Canning, Fodhla Cronin O'Reilly and Emile Sherman serve as producers with See-Saw Films, BBC Films and the British Film Institute. In March 2019, Fiona Shaw announced her role in the film. In May 2019, it was announced Alec Secareanu, James McArdle and Gemma Jones had joined the cast of the film.

Principal photography began on 11 March 2019, in Lyme Regis, Dorset. The scenes were shot chronologically in order to deepen the immersion in the characters' psychological trajectory. David Tucker, director of the Lyme Regis Museum, consulted on the film's scientific accuracy.

Release
In February 2019, Lionsgate and Transmission Films acquired UK and Australian distribution rights to Ammonite, respectively. In January 2020, Neon acquired US and Canadian distribution rights to the film for $3 million. Ammonite was set to world premiere at that year's Cannes Film Festival, prior to its cancellation due to the COVID-19 pandemic. It was also selected to screen at the Telluride Film Festival in Colorado in September of that year, prior to its cancellation also due to the pandemic.

Ammonite had its world premiere at the Toronto International Film Festival on 11 September. Winslet was awarded TIFF's Tribute Actor Award. Ammonite has or is scheduled to be screened at several film festivals including Deauville, Hamptons, Mill Valley, Newfest, Ghent, London, Chicago and Montclair.

Ammonite was theatrically released in the United States on 13 November. It was subsequently released in Australia on 14 January 2021 and in the United Kingdom on 26 March 2021.

Reception

Box office 
In its opening weekend the film grossed $87,552 from 280 cinemas.

Critical response 
The website's critical consensus reads, "The chemistry between Saoirse Ronan and a never-better Kate Winslet helps Ammonite transcend its period romance trappings." On Metacritic, the film has a weighted average score of 72 out of 100, based on 41 critics, indicating "generally favorable reviews".

Katie Rife of The A.V. Club gave the film a B− for a lack of chemistry between the leads and an inconsistent tone: "this is a film that runs either burning-hot or bone-chilling cold, contrasting blue toes dipping into freezing, frothy sea water with flushed cheeks and tousled updos in post-coital repose". The Hollywood Reporter placed the movie number 4 at their best films of 2020 year-end list. The film was placed at the 27th position on the IndieWire list of the 50 Best Movies of 2020 and 43rd at the Esquire year-end list. The movie also appeared on the RogerEbert.com "The Best Films of 2020" year-end list.

Historical accuracy
There is no evidence as to Anning's sexuality in real life, and the film's historical accuracy has been questioned. Two of Anning's distant relatives were reported as having differing views on the decision to depict her as a lesbian, with Lorraine Anning supporting the film, but Barbara Anning criticizing the choice.

Lee defended his decision, saying in a series of tweets, "After seeing queer history be routinely 'straightened' throughout culture, and given a historical figure where there is no evidence whatsoever of a heterosexual relationship, is it not permissible to view that person within another context? Would these newspaper writers have felt the need to whip up uninformed quotes from self-proclaimed experts if the character’s sexuality had been assumed to be heterosexual?" Some reviews also criticized the choice. A piece in The Guardian read, "No one knows if Mary Anning had lovers. But what a new film does get right is the vital role women played in her life".

Accolades

References

Further reading

External links
 
 
 Ammonite at BBC Film
 
 Ammonite at British Council Film

2020 films
2020 biographical drama films
2020 independent films
2020 LGBT-related films
2020 romantic drama films
Australian biographical drama films
Australian LGBT-related films
Australian romantic drama films
British biographical drama films
British LGBT-related films
British romantic drama films
Biographical films about scientists
2020s English-language films
Lesbian-related films
LGBT-related romantic drama films
Films set in the 1840s
Films set in Dorset
Films shot in Dorset
Films shot in Kent
Films directed by Francis Lee
Films with screenplays by Francis Lee
Films produced by Iain Canning
Films produced by Fodhla Cronin O'Reilly
Films produced by Emile Sherman
Films scored by Dustin O'Halloran
BBC Film films
Biographical films about LGBT people
2020s British films